The Yorktown Formation is a mapped bedrock unit in the Coastal Plain of Maryland, Virginia, North Carolina and South Carolina.  It is overconsolidated and highly fossiliferous.

Description
The Yorktown is composed largely of overconsolidated sand and clay with abundant calcareous shells, primarily bivalves.

Stratigraphy
The Yorktown unconformably overlies the Miocene Eastover Formation, and conformably underlies the Pliocene Croatan Formation.

The Yorktown was divided into members by Ward and Blackwelder (1980).  These are in ascending order: Sunken Meadow Member, Rushmere Member, Morgarts Beach Member, and Moore House Member. The uppermost Tunnels Mill Member is recognized in Maryland only.

Notable exposures
Type Section: Yorktown, Virginia on southwest side of York River, York County
Carters Grove Bluffs, north side of James River 
Moore House Bluff, southwest side of York River, York County  (very close to type section)

Age
Hazel (1971) revised the age of the Yorktown from Miocene to Late Miocene to Early Pliocene using ostracod biostratigraphy.  The age was revised by Gibson (1983) to extend into the Middle Pliocene based on foraminifera.  Further biostratigraphic work with ostracods and foraminifera was completed by Cronin (1991), which also summarized previous investigations.

Fossils
Bivalves, including Glycymeris subovata (see Glycymerididae), Chesapecten jeffersonius, Chesapecten madisonius, Mercenaria tridacnoides, Panopera reflexa, Chama, Ensis, Striarca and Noetia (see Noetiidae), Cerastoderma, Dosinia, Mulinia, Kuphus (Shipworm), Panope (Geoduck), and the oyster Ostrea
Gastropods, including Crucibulum, Calliostoma, Busycon, Turritella, and Crepidula
Foraminifera, including the biostratigraphic marker species Dentoglobigerina altispira (see Globigerinida), Sphaeroidinellopsis, and Globorotalia puncticulata
Scleractinian corals, including Septastrea marylandica, Paracyathus vaughani (see Caryophylliidae), and Astrangia lineata
Ostracods
Bryozoans
Barnacles, including Balanus
Worms
Sponges
Birds, including the large pelican Pelecanus schreiberi.
Whales, including the prehistoric sperm whale Scaldicetus.

Gallery

References

Neogene geology of Virginia

Neogene geology of North Carolina